Keith Cameron (born 3 February 1978 in Whakatāne) is a New Zealand rugby union player who currently plays as a prop for Otago in the Air New Zealand Cup.

Cameron made his provincial debut for Otago in the NPC in 1999. He transferred to Southland for the 2001 season, but later returned to Otago. He was selected in the Highlanders squad for the 2007 Super 14 season and made his Super Rugby debut against the Lions on 10 February 2007. He was also selected for the New Zealand Māori squad (representing Te Whānau-ā-Apanui iwi) for the 2007 Churchill Cup and played two games, starting against Canada and coming on as a reserve in the final against England Saxons.

For the 2009 Super 14 season, Cameron is part of the Highlanders' wider training group, although not the main squad.

References

External links
Otago player profile
New Zealand Māori player profile

1978 births
Living people
New Zealand rugby union players
Rugby union props
Rugby union players from Whakatāne
Māori All Blacks players
Highlanders (rugby union) players
Otago rugby union players
Southland rugby union players